Johnny Wilson may refer to:

 John H. Wilson (Hawaii politician) (1871–1956), Mayor of Honolulu
 Johnny Wilson (boxer) (1893–1985), American boxer
 Johnny Wilson (American football) (1915–2002), from Ohio, played for the Cleveland Rams in the NFL
 Jumping Johnny Wilson (1927–2019), American basketball & baseball player
 Johnny Wilson (ice hockey) (1929–2011), Canadian ice hockey player and coach

See also
 Jack Wilson (disambiguation)
 John Wilson (disambiguation)
 Jonathan Wilson (disambiguation)